Melicope littoralis , commonly known as shade tree, is a species of shrub or small tree in the family Rutaceae and is endemic to Norfolk Island. It has trifoliate leaves and small white flowers borne in leaf axils in panicles of a few to many flowers.

Description

Taxonomy
The shade tree was first formally described in 1833 by Stephan Endlicher who gave it the name Euodia littoralis and published the description in his book Prodromus Florae Norfolkicae.<ref name="Endl.">{{cite book |last1=Endlicher |first1=Stephan |title=Prodromus Florae Norfolkicae |date=1833 |pages=86–87 |url=https://www.biodiversitylibrary.org/item/29543#page/100/mode/1up |accessdate=27 July 2020}}</ref> In 2001, Thomas Gordon Hartley changed the name to Melicope littoralis in the journal Allertonia.

Distribution and habitat
This species is endemic to Norfolk Island where it grows in coastal and inland forest. It is most often seen in the Norfolk Island National Park.

Conservation statusMelicope littoralis is listed as "vulnerable" under the Australian Government Environment Protection and Biodiversity Conservation Act 1999''.

References

littoralis
Flora of Norfolk Island
Plants described in 1833
Sapindales of Australia
Taxa named by Stephan Endlicher